In probability theory, especially in mathematical statistics, a location–scale family is a family of probability distributions parametrized by a location parameter and a non-negative scale parameter. For any random variable  whose probability distribution function belongs to such a family, the distribution function of  also belongs to the family (where  means "equal in distribution"—that is, "has the same distribution as"). 

 If  has a cumulative distribution function , then  has a cumulative distribution function .
 If  is a discrete random variable with probability mass function , then  is a discrete random variable with probability mass function .
 If  is a continuous random variable with probability density function , then  is a continuous random variable with probability density function .

In decision theory, if all alternative distributions available to a decision-maker are in the same location–scale family, and the first two moments are finite,  then a two-moment decision model can apply, and decision-making can be framed in terms of the means and the variances of the distributions.

Examples 

Often, location–scale families are restricted to those where all members have the same functional form. Most location–scale families are univariate, though not all. Well-known families in which the functional form of the distribution is consistent throughout the family include the following:

 Normal distribution
 Elliptical distributions
 Cauchy distribution
 Uniform distribution (continuous)
 Uniform distribution (discrete)
 Logistic distribution
 Laplace distribution
 Student's t-distribution
 Generalized extreme value distribution

Converting a single distribution to a location–scale family
The following shows how to implement a location–scale family in a statistical package or programming environment where only functions for the "standard" version of a distribution are available. It is designed for R but should generalize to any language and library.

The example here is of the Student's t-distribution, which is normally provided in R only in its standard form, with a single degrees of freedom parameter df. The versions below with _ls appended show how to generalize this to a generalized Student's t-distribution with an arbitrary location parameter mu and scale parameter sigma.

Note that the generalized functions do not have standard deviation sigma since the standard t distribution does not have standard deviation of 1.

References

External links
 http://www.randomservices.org/random/special/LocationScale.html

Parametric statistics
Types of probability distributions